Ioannis Kapraras (born 13 February 1968) is a Greek alpine skier. He competed at the 1988 Winter Olympics and the 1992 Winter Olympics.

References

External links
 

1968 births
Living people
Greek male alpine skiers
Olympic alpine skiers of Greece
Alpine skiers at the 1988 Winter Olympics
Alpine skiers at the 1992 Winter Olympics
Sportspeople from Veria